Arnold John Shaw (12 July 1909 – 27 June 1984) was a British Labour Party politician.

Shaw was educated at the Trafalgar Square primary school, Stepney, Coopers' Company School and University College, Southampton. He was a councillor on Stepney Borough Council 1934–38, Ilford Borough Council 1952-65 and the London Borough of Redbridge from 1965.

Shaw contested the constituency of Ilford South six times between 1964 and 1979, twice serving as its Member of Parliament from 1966 to 1970 and from February 1974 to 1979, when he lost the seat to the Conservative Neil Thorne.

References 
Times Guide to the House of Commons 1979

|-

1909 births
1984 deaths
Labour Party (UK) MPs for English constituencies
Councillors in Greater London
Councillors in the London Borough of Redbridge
Alumni of the University of Southampton
UK MPs 1966–1970
UK MPs 1974
UK MPs 1974–1979